Thailand's Got Talent season 1 (also known as TGT) was the first season of the Thailand's Got Talent reality television series on the Channel 3 television network, and part of the global British Got Talent series. It is a talent show that features singers, dancers, sketch artists, comedians and other performers of all ages competing for the advertised top prize of 10,000,000 Baht (approximately $325,000). The show debuted in March 2011. Thailand is also the fifth country in Asia to license Got Talent series. The three judges Nirut Sirijanya, Benz Pomchita Na Songkla, and Pinyo Rutham join hosts Krit Sribhumisret and Ketsepsawat Palagawongse na Ayutthaya.

The winner of the first season was Myra Maneepatsorn Molloy, a 13-year- old singer, who took home the first place prize of 10,000,000 Baht (approximately $325,000).

Format

Broadcast
 Audition for 5 weeks.
 Round 6 weeks.
 The final two weeks.
 The display is cut or not to broadcast will be released via the web. Site in the name. In Thailand gods of Morgan Lane West (Thailand's Got More Talent), as well as the original from England.

Pre-casting
 North on Nov 26-28 at the Lotus Hotel Pang Suan Kaew, Chiang Mai.
 Northeast on Dec 3-5 at Charoen Thani Princess in Khon Kaen.
 Central and Eastern on Dec 10-12 at the Bangkok Convention Centre at Central Plaza Lat Phrao, Bangkok.
 South on Dec 24-26 at the International Conference Centre. National celebrations every 60 years, Hat Yai, Songkhla.

Audition
In January 2011, at the theater Aksara King Power Complex and Work Point studio for 6 days broadcast on Sunday From March 6 to April 3, 2011, 5 at which this cycle is a cycle that will be aired on television in many ways. Countries that do not have an opponent from round to round of auditions for the 321 participants must show their ability to express themselves within 2–4 minutes, which shall have the right to stop. the display. If one third of the people when the Buzzer will stop immediately. The Committee is asked to press the buzzer to stop by any of the Board of Directors will consider the ability to sound at least two of three in the competition to determine who enters the next round or not. Then the tape shows a selection of the finalists of the last remaining 48 shows. Into the finals.

Semi-final 
Finals will be broadcast live on the 48th of the last to audiences throughout the country for six weeks of studio work point. Pathum Thani province. Judging by the votes of the audience through SMS SMS during a live person with the most votes will automatically be finalists. For those who have votes in the first two, and three judges will decide who is qualified by a two-thirds, as well as the fairly steep in this part of the show is taped before a three-hour to an hour. First added to prevent mistakes. The announcement will be broadcast live.

Semi-final summary
The "Number" columns lists the code of appearance each act made for every episode.

Semi-final 1 (10 April 2011)

Semi-final 2 (17 April 2011)

Semi-final 3 (24 April 2011)

Semi-final 4 (1 May 2011)

Semi-final 5 (8 May 2011)

Semi-final 6 (15 May 2011)

Grand final 
Final Round broadcast show of 12 Finalist and decision based on the public vote only

Rating

External links 
 Got Talent website(in Thai)

References 

Thailand's Got Talent seasons
2011 Thai television seasons

th:ไทยแลนด์ก็อตทาเลนต์